Saddington is a surname. Notable people with the surname include:

Col Saddington (1937–2012), Australian rules footballer
George Saddington (born 1905), English professional rugby league player
Jason Saddington (born 1979), Australian rules footballer
John Saddington (1634?—1679), Muggletonian writer and London sugar merchant
Nigel Saddington (born 1965), English professional footballer
Wendy Saddington a.k.a. Gandharvika Dasi (1949—2013), Australian blues, soul and jazz singer